Anta District may refer to:

Anta District, Acobamba in Peru
Anta District, Anta in Peru
Anta District, Carhuaz in Peru

District name disambiguation pages